The Queen Who Kept Her Head is a 1934 historical play by the British writer Winifred Carter. It is based on the life of Catherine Parr, the sixth and final wife of Henry VIII, who outlived him.

It ran for twenty two performances at the Kingsway Theatre in London West End. The play featured Laura Cowie as Catherine with Raymond Lovell as King Henry. The cast also included Bernard Lee, Felicity Carter and Aubrey Mallalieu. 

The play text was published in 1938.

References

Bibliography
 Wearing, J. P. The London Stage: 1930-1939. Rowman & Littlefield, 2014.

1934 plays
British plays
Plays set in the 16th century
Plays set in London
Plays by Winifred Carter
Plays based on real people
Plays about British royalty
Cultural depictions of Henry VIII
West End plays